The 1909 Chinese parliamentary election was an indirect election to the first imperial Advisory Council, a preparatory body of the parliament created under the constitutional reform bought by the late Qing dynasty. It was seen as the first popular election in Chinese history. 

Originally 100 members, half of the seats in the Council were to be elected by the members of the Provincial Consultative Assemblies, while the other half were appointed by the Emperor. Due to the fact the Provincial Consultative Assembly had not been set up in Sinkiang, the seats were reduced to 98.

Translations with bracketed Chinese text are for reference only.

Electoral system 
The candidates were indirectly elected by members of Consultative Assembly in provinces. The number of candidate each electorate shall vote for was double the delegated seats. Amongst all the supported candidates, half of them would be chosen by the governor as elected members. Appointed members included a certain degree of election features as there were considerable size of eligible members.

Constituencies
The new Advisory Council only consisted of 196 members, instead of 200 as planned, as Consultative Assembly was not established in Sinkiang, and the number of appointed members shrank to 98 to achieve the balance.

Elected members are as follows:

Appointed members are as follows:

Result 
The constitutionalists, who advocated constitutional monarchy in Qing, secured a majority in the Advisory Council. The revolutionaries on the other hand, despite banned by the authorities, won a few seats. The party membership is only estimation as political party system was immature at the time. Some members resigned during the session and the vacancies were filled according to the precedence list, which their membership is not reflected here.

Detailed results

See also
Democracy in China
1909 Chinese provincial elections

References

1909 in China
China
September 1909 events
October 1909 events